Pueblo Mountain is the highest mountain of the Pueblo Mountains mountain range, at  in elevation. It is located in Harney County in southeastern Oregon, within the Great Basin region of the western United States.

References

External links
  
 

Mountains of Oregon
Landforms of Harney County, Oregon